Talinranta is a neighbourhood in Munkkiniemi district of Helsinki, Finland. It is located west from Munkkivuori and south from Tali. In south, Finnish national road 1 separates Talinranta from Vanha Munkkiniemi.

 Talinranta has 1,226 inhabitants living in an area of 0.40 km2

References 

Munkkiniemi